An eared seal, otariid or otary is any member of the marine mammal family Otariidae, one of three groupings of pinnipeds. They comprise 15 extant species in seven genera (another species became extinct in the 1950s) and are commonly known either as sea lions or fur seals, distinct from true seals (phocids) and the walrus (odobenids). Otariids are adapted to a semiaquatic lifestyle, feeding and migrating in the water, but breeding and resting on land or ice. They reside in subpolar, temperate, and equatorial waters throughout the Pacific and Southern Oceans and the southern Indian and Atlantic Oceans. They are conspicuously absent in the north Atlantic.

The words 'otariid' and 'otary' come from the Greek  meaning "little ear", referring to the small but visible external ear flaps (pinnae), which distinguishes them from the phocids.

Evolution and taxonomy

Morphological and molecular evidence supports a monophyetic origin of pinnipeds, sharing a common ancestor with Musteloidea, though an earlier hypothesis suggested that Otаriidae are descended from a common ancestor most closely related to modern bears. Debate remains as to whether the phocids diverged from the otariids before or after the walrus.

Otariids arose in the Miocene (15–17 million years ago) in the North Pacific, diversifying rapidly into the Southern Hemisphere, where most species now live. The earliest known fossil otariid is Eotaria crypta from southern California, while the genus Callorhinus (northern fur seal) has the oldest fossil record of any living otariid, extending to the middle Pliocene. It probably arose from the extinct fur seal genus Thalassoleon.

Traditionally, otariids had been subdivided into the fur seal (Arctocephalinae) and sea lion (Otariinae) subfamilies, with the major distinction between them being the presence of a thick underfur layer in the former. Under this categorization, the fur seals comprised two genera: Callorhinus in the North Pacific with a single representative, the northern fur seal (C. ursinus), and eight species in the Southern Hemisphere under the genus Arctocephalus; while the sea lions comprise five species under five genera. Recent analyses of the genetic evidence suggests that Callorhinus ursinus is in fact more closely related to several sea lion species. Furthermore, many of the Otariinae appear to be more phylogenetically distinct than previously assumed; for example, the Japanese sea lion (Zalophus japonicus) is now considered a separate species, rather than a subspecies of the California sea lion (Zalophus californius). 

In light of this evidence, the subfamily separation has been removed entirely and the family Otariidae has been organized into seven genera with 16 species and two subspecies.
Nonetheless, because of morphological and behavioral similarities among the "fur seals" and "sea lions", these remain useful categories when discussing differences between groups of species. Compared to sea lions, fur seals are generally smaller, exhibit greater sexual dimorphism, eat smaller prey and go on longer foraging trips; and, of course, there is the contrast between the coarse short sea lion hair and the fur seal's fur.

Anatomy and appearance

Otariids have proportionately much larger foreflippers and pectoral muscles than phocids, and have the ability to turn their hind limbs forward and walk on all fours, making them far more maneuverable on land. They are generally considered to be less adapted to an aquatic lifestyle, since they breed primarily on land and haul out more frequently than true seals. However, they can attain higher bursts of speed and have greater maneuverability in the water. Their swimming power derives from the use of flippers more so than the sinuous whole-body movements typical of phocids and walruses.

Otariids are further distinguished by a more dog-like head, sharp, well-developed canines, and the aforementioned visible external pinnae. Their postcanine teeth are generally simple and conical in shape. The dental formula for eared seals is: . Sea lions are covered with coarse guard hairs, while fur seals have a thick underfur, which has historically made them the objects of commercial exploitation.

Male otariids range in size from the 70-kg (150-lb) Galápagos fur seal, smallest of all otariids, to the over 1,000-kg (2,200-lb) Steller sea lion. Mature male otariids weigh two to six times as much as females, with proportionately larger heads, necks, and chests, making them the most sexually dimorphic of all mammals.

Behavior
All otariids breed on land during well-defined breeding seasons. Except for the Australian sea lion, which has an atypical 17.5 month breeding cycle, they form strictly annual aggregations on beaches or rocky substrates, often on islands. All species are polygynous; i.e. successful males breed with several females. In most species, males arrive at breeding sites first and establish and maintain territories through vocal and visual displays and occasional fighting. Females typically arrive on shore a day or so before giving birth. While considered social animals, no permanent hierarchies or statuses are established on the colonies. The extent to which males control females or territories varies between species. Thus, the northern fur seal and the South American sea lion tend to herd specific harem-associated females, occasionally injuring them, while the Steller sea lion and the New Zealand sea lion control spatial territories, but do not generally interfere with the movement of the females. Female New Zealand sea lions are the only otrariids that move up to  into forests to protect their pups during the breeding season.

Otariids are carnivorous, feeding on fish, squid and krill. Sea lions tend to feed closer to shore in upwelling zones, feeding on larger fish, while the smaller fur seals tend to take longer, offshore foraging trips and can subsist on large numbers of smaller prey items. They are visual feeders. Some females are capable of dives of up to 400 m (1,300 ft).

Species
Family Otariidae
 Subfamily Arctocephalinae (fur seals)
 Genus Arctocephalus
 Brown fur seal, A. pusillus
South African fur seal, A. pusillus pusillus
Australian fur seal, A. pusillus doriferus
Antarctic fur seal, A. gazella
 Guadalupe fur seal, A. townsendi
 Juan Fernández fur seal, A. philippii
 Galápagos fur seal, A. galapagoensis
New Zealand fur seal (or southern fur seal), A. forsteri
 Subantarctic fur seal, A. tropicalis
 South American fur seal, A. australis
Genus Callorhinus
 Northern fur seal, C. ursinus
 Subfamily Otariinae (sea lions)
 Genus Eumetopias
 Steller sea lion, E. jubatus
 Genus Neophoca
 Australian sea lion, N. cinerea
 Genus Otaria
 South American sea lion, O. flavescens
 Genus Phocarctos
 New Zealand sea lion (or Hooker's sea lion), P. hookeri
 Genus Zalophus
 California sea lion, Z. californianus
 †Japanese sea lion, Z. japonicus – extinct (1970s)
 Galápagos sea lion, Z. wollebaeki

Although the two subfamilies of otariids, the Otariinae (sea lions) and Arctocephalinae (fur seals), are still widely used, recent molecular studies have demonstrated that they may be invalid. Instead, they suggest three clades within the family; one consisting of the northern sea lions (Eumetopias and Zalophus), one of the northern fur seal (Callorhinus) and its extinct relatives, and the third of all the remaining Southern Hemisphere species.

References

Further reading
 Berta, A., and L. Sumich (1999) Marine Mammals: Evolutionary Biology. San Diego: Academic Press.
 Gentry, R. L (1998) Behavior and Ecology of the Northern Fur Seal. Princeton: Princeton University Press.
 Perrin, W. F., B. Würsig, and J. G. M. Thewissen (2002) Encyclopedia of Marine Mammals. San Diego: Academic Press.
 Riedman, M. (1990) The Pinnipeds: Seals, Sea Lions and Walruses. Berkeley: University of California Press.

External links
 Eared Seals on Answers.com
 Otariids on MarineBio.org

 
Pinnipeds
Extant Burdigalian first appearances
Taxa named by John Edward Gray
Mammal families